Twelve Bar Blues is a 2001 novel by Patrick Neate, and the winner of that year's Whitbread novel award.

The story is essentially about two people who share a common history - Fortis 'Lick' Holden, a cornet player in early 20th Century New Orleans, and Sylvia Di Napoli, a retired prostitute living in modern-day London, who is searching for her ancestry. Louis Armstrong is also featured in the novel.

2001 British novels
Novels about music
Viking Press books
Novels set in London
Novels set in New Orleans
Cultural depictions of Louis Armstrong